Super House of Dead Ninjas is a platform game developed by Megadev and published by Adult Swim Games for Microsoft Windows in 2013. The game is a remake of House of Dead Ninjas, a freeware browser game available on the Adult Swim website.

Gameplay
The player plays as a ninja and is tasked with descending a randomly generated 350-storey tower. Players have a limited time to descend all 350 storeys, with power ups available to increase the time. The player character fills a "rage" meter by defeating enemies; when full, the player enters into a "rage" mode that makes them deal greater damage and become invulnerable until it runs out. The "rage" mode can be extended by defeating enemies with a full meter. The player can also unlock weapons and magic spells by meeting specific criteria during gameplay.

Reception
Super House of Dead Ninjas received mostly favorable reviews, resulting in the averaged score of 79/100 at Metacritic. Nikola Suprak of Hardcore Gamer described it as "bloody, violent, difficult and a sadistic kind of fun that makes it hard to put down (...) cramming every second of gameplay with as much blood, combat, and fun as possible, a game that is really hard to pass up at its meager asking price, and even harder to stop playing." In an also positive review, Destructoid's Fraser Brown opined "the instant challenge and frantic pace makes it perfect to just pick up and play for 15 minutes, while the tight controls and potentially limitless number of floors makes it easy to pour hours into," but recommended to first try out the game's free version.

References

External links

Super House of Dead Ninjas on Steam

2013 video games
Browser games
Free online games
Video games about ninja
Platform games
Single-player video games
Video games developed in the United Kingdom
Video games featuring female protagonists
Windows games